Freedom Records was a jazz record label headed by Shel Safran and founded by Alan Bates as a division of Black Lion Records.

Individual recordings were distributed via Polydor Records and Transatlantic Records during the early 1970s before the company was bought by Arista Records with the imprint dubbed Arista/Freedom in 1975.

Discography
1000: Albert Ayler & Don Cherry - Vibrations
1001: Marion Brown - Porto Novo
1002: Charles Tolliver - Paper Man
1003: Gato Barbieri & Dollar Brand- Confluence
1004: Randy Weston - Carnival
1005: Cecil Taylor - Silent Tongues
1006: Roswell Rudd - Flexible Flyer
1007: Andrew Hill - Spiral
1008: Oliver Lake - Heavy Spirits
1009: Stanley Cowell -  Brilliant Circles
1010: Roland Hanna -  Perugia
1011: Dewey Redman -  Look for the Black Star
1012: Julius Hemphill -  Coon Bid'ness
1013: Mal Waldron -  Blues for Lady Day
1014: Randy Weston - Blues to Africa
1015: Frank Lowe -  Fresh
1016: Archie Shepp - There's a Trumpet in My Soul
1017: Tolliver, Charles -  The Ringer
1018: Ayler, Albert -  Witches & Devils
1019: New York Mary -  New York Mary
1020: Hampton Hawes - Live at the Montmartre
1021: Ted Curson - Tears for Dolphy
1022: Human Arts Ensemble -  Under the Sun
1023: Hill, Andrew -  Live At Montreux
1024: Oliver Lake - Ntu: Point from Which Creation Begins
1025: John Payne & Louis Levin - Bedtime Stories
1026: Randy Weston - Berkshire Blues
1027: Shepp, Archie - Montreux One
1028: Julius Hemphill - Dogon A.D.
1029: Rudd, Roswell - Inside Job
1030: Ted Curson - Flip Top
1031: Jan Garbarek - Esoteric Circle
1032: Stanley Cowell - Blues for the Viet Cong
1033: Stephane Grappelli -  Parisian Thoroughfare
1034: Archie Shepp - Montreux Two
1035: New York Mary - Piece of the Apple
1036: Payne, John & Louis Levin - Razor's Edge
1037: Richard Teitelbaum and Anthony Braxton - Time Zones
1038: Cecil Taylor - Indent
1039: Human Arts Ensemble -  Whisper Of Dharma
1040: Miroslav Vitous - Miroslav
1041: Dudu Pukwana - Diamond Express
1042: Mal Waldron - Signals
1043: Hawes, Hampton -  A Little Copenhagen Night Music
1900: Ornette Coleman - The Great London Concert
1901: Paul Bley -  Copenhagen And Haarlem
1902: Braxton, Anthony - The Complete Braxton 1971
1903: Art Ensemble Of Chicago -  Paris Session (The Spiritual and Tutankhamun reissued together)
1904: Marion Brown - Duets
1905: Taylor, Cecil -  Nefertiti, the Beautiful One Has Come
1906: Dave Burrell - High Won-High Two

See also
 List of record labels

References

External links
Freedom Records at www.jazzdiscography.com

Defunct record labels of the United States
Jazz record labels
Smooth jazz record labels
Experimental music record labels
Blues record labels